George Murray Hulbert (May 14, 1881 – April 26, 1950) was a United States representative from New York and a United States district judge of the United States District Court for the Southern District of New York.

Education and career

Born on May 14, 1881, in Rochester, New York, Hulbert moved to Waterloo, New York and attended the public schools. He received a Bachelor of Laws in 1902 from the New York University School of Law. He was admitted to the bar in 1902 and entered private practice in New York City from 1902 to 1934.

Congressional service

Hulbert was elected as a Democrat to the United States House of Representatives of the 64th and 65th United States Congresses and served from March 4, 1915, to January 1, 1918.

Later career

Hulbert was the Commissioner of Docks and the Director of the Port of New York City starting in 1918. He was elected in November 1921 as President of the Board of Aldermen of New York City, serving from 1921 to 1925. He served as the acting Mayor of New York City during the long illness of John Francis Hylan. He served as President of the Boston, Cape Cod and New York Canal Company.

Removal from the Board of Aldermen

Hulbert was ousted from the Presidency of the Board after he accepted an honorary position as a member of the Finger Lakes Park Commission that was offered by New York Governor Al Smith. In a decision by New York State Supreme Court judge Joseph M. Proskauer, according to section 1549 of the New York City Charter, Hulbert automatically vacated his position in city government by accepting an appointment at the state level.

Federal judicial service

Hulbert was nominated by President Franklin D. Roosevelt on June 6, 1934, to a seat on the United States District Court for the Southern District of New York vacated by Judge Frank J. Coleman. He was confirmed by the United States Senate on June 14, 1934, and received his commission on June 15, 1934. His service terminated on April 26, 1950, due to his death in Bayport, New York. He was interred in the Gate of Heaven Cemetery in Valhalla, New York.

References

External links
 

1881 births
1950 deaths
Judges of the United States District Court for the Southern District of New York
United States district court judges appointed by Franklin D. Roosevelt
20th-century American judges
New York Law School alumni
Burials at Gate of Heaven Cemetery (Hawthorne, New York)
People from Waterloo, New York
Commissioners of Docks and Ferries of the City of New York
Democratic Party members of the United States House of Representatives from New York (state)
Politicians from Rochester, New York
People from Bayport, New York
Lawyers from Rochester, New York